Donald Stewart (born 11 April 1967) is a former Western Samoa international rugby league footballer.

Playing career
A Northcote Tigers junior, Stewart began his career at Centre before moving into the forward pack. He won four Fox Memorial titles with Northcote between 1989 and 1993.

In 1994 Stewart joined the North Harbour Sea Eagles in the new Lion Red Cup, and was part of the Grand Final winning team. He was also picked by Western Samoa when they conducted a tour of New Zealand in the middle of the year.

Stewart captained the Sea Eagles in 1995, scoring 16 tries and again being part of a grand final winning side. Stewart was again part of the side in 1996, although they couldn't manage a third consecutive championship win. When the Lion Red Cup ended in 1996, Stewart had played in 65 matches and scored 34 tries.

In 1997 and 1998 Stewart represented Auckland in the National Provincial Competitions.

References

Living people
New Zealand rugby league players
Samoa national rugby league team players
Auckland rugby league team players
North Harbour rugby league team players
Northcote Tigers players
1967 births
Rugby league centres
Rugby league props
Rugby league second-rows